The population of the Byzantine Empire encompassed all ethnic and tribal groups living there, mainly Byzantine Greeks, but also Khazars, Bulgars, Turks, Armenians, Slavs, Goths, Arabs, Illyrians, Thracians, Assyrians, Tzans and   other groups. It fluctuated throughout the state's millennial history. The reign of the Emperor Justinian I in the mid-sixth century was the high point of the empire's expansion; however, the arrival of plague in 541 AD and its subsequent recurrences caused a severe depletion of the population. After the reign of Emperor Heraclius and the loss of the empire's overseas territories, Byzantium was limited to the Balkans and Anatolia. When the empire began to recover after a series of conflicts in the 8th century and its territories stabilized, its population began to recover. By the end of the 8th century the population of the empire was around 7,000,000, a figure that climbed to over 12,000,000 people by 1025 AD. The numbers began falling steadily to 9,000,000 people at 1204 AD and even lower to 5,000,000 people at 1282 AD with the arrival of the Turks.

Population estimates

References

Bibliography

Further reading

External links

Society of the Byzantine Empire
Society of Greece
Demographics
Demographics of the Middle East